Possibili scenari is the sixth studio album by Italian singer-songwriter Cesare Cremonini, released on November 24, 2017 by Trecuori. It topped the Italian album charts in the week of its release.

On 7 December 2018 the album was reissued in piano and voice edition, in which the artist completely rewrote the arrangements of the original pieces with the solo piano.

Track listing

  Possibili scenari – 5:11
  Kashmir-Kashmir – 4:09
  Poetica – 4:53
  Un uomo nuovo – 5:41
  Nessuno vuole essere Robin – 4:44 (Cesare Cremonini)
  Silent Hill – 4:13
  Il cielo era sereno – 4:33
  La isla – 4:46
  Al tuo matrimonio – 4:25
  La macchina del tempo – 7:02

Charts

References

2017 albums
Cesare Cremonini (musician) albums